Scarborough High School may refer to:

Canada

 R. H. King Academy - Toronto, Ontario

United Kingdom

 Scarborough High School for Boys (Scarborough, North Yorkshire) – now Graham School
 Scarborough Girls' High School (Scarborough, North Yorkshire) – now Graham School
 Scarborough Sixth Form College
 Scarborough College

United States

 Scarborough High School (Maine) - Scarborough, Maine
 Scarborough High School (Texas) - Houston, Texas

See also
 Scarborough Day School
 Scarborough College